Several vessels have been named Tom:

 was launched in 1771 in Britain. Between 1778 and 1792 she was a West Indiaman, trading between Lancaster and Jamaica, St Lucia, and Grenada. New owners in 1792 sailed Tom as a slave ship in the triangular trade in enslaved people. She was condemned in 1794 at Barbados after having delivered the slaves she had acquired in the Cameroons.
 (or Toms) was launched in 1780 in America, possibly under another name. She first appeared in British records in 1792. From 1792 Tom participated as a slave ship in the triangular trade in enslaved people. She made two complete voyages from Liverpool. French frigates captured her in 1794 before she could acquire any slaves.
 was launched at Whitby in 1798 as a West Indiaman. New owners in 1802 resulted in Tom becoming a whaler in the southern whale fishery. The Spanish seized her in 1805 off Peru.

Ship names